FabricLive.34 is a DJ mix compilation album by Krafty Kuts, as part of the FabricLive Mix Series.

Track listing
Krafty Kuts - Intro (FabricLive Mix CD Version) - Against the Grain/Supercharged Music
2 tracks mixed:
A Skillz - Jelly - Finger Lickin'
Lords of the Underground - What I'm After (Acapella) - Capitol
2 tracks mixed:
Milke - She Says - Adrift
Grandmaster Flash and the Furious Five - "The Message" (Acapella) - Sanctuary
Malente - Move your Body - Unique
Lady Waks & Hardy Hand ft. Mr X "Minimal" - Minimal - Menu
Friendly - It's the Weekend - Finger Lickin' 
Krafty Kuts ft. Tim Deluxe - Bass Phenomenon (VIP Mix) - Against the Grain/Supercharged Music
Krafty Kuts & DJ Icey - Thru the Door (Krafty Kuts Remix) - Against the Grain/Zone
Dave Spoon - At Night (Beat Vandals Remix) - Toolroom
Krafty Kuts vs. Deepcut - Beer Chucker - Deepcut
Maelstrom - Disto Funk - Menu
Splitloop - Tweaked Out - Supercharged Music/Against the Grain
Krafty Kuts ft. Ashley Slater - Freakshow (VIP Mix) - Against the Grain/Supercharged Music
Plump DJs - Listen to the Baddest - Finger Lickin' 
Madox - Roger Milla - Expanded
Ralph Robles - Takin' Over - Fania
2 tracks mixed:
Joe Jackson - Is She Really Going Out with Him? - A&M
Deekline & Ed Solo ft. DJ Assault - One in the Front (Acapella) - Rat
Rob le Pitch - Twisted (Tom Real and Rogue Element Mix) - Passenger
Aquasky ft. Acafool - Have A Good Time - Passenger
2 tracks mixed:
Freestylers ft. Corinna Greyson - In Love with You (Instrumental) - Against the Grain/Supercharged Music
Krafty Kuts ft. Dynamite MC - There they Go (Acapella) - Against the Grain/Supercharged Music
Primal Scream - Funky Jam - Sony BMG

External links
Fabric: FabricLive.34

Fabric (club) albums
Krafty Kuts albums
2007 compilation albums